The South African Students Congress (SASCO) is a South African student organisation currently led by Bamanye Matiwane as the organization's President. SASCO was founded in September 1991 at Rhodes University in Grahamstown, Eastern Cape, through the merger of the South African National Student Congress (SANSCO) and the National Union of South African Students (NUSAS).  The predecessor of SANSCO, the Azanian Students Organisation (AZASO) was initially formed in 1979 as a continuation of the South African Students Organisation (SASO) when the latter was banned by the Apartheid government.  SASO, in turn, got started by Steve Biko as a breakaway faction from NUSAS in the 1960s.

SASCO is the biggest student movement in Africa .

References

External links
 SASCO's official website

Student organisations in South Africa
1991 establishments in South Africa
Student organizations established in 1991
Civic and political organisations based in Johannesburg